The rusty tinamou or short-billed tinamou (Crypturellus brevirostris) is a type of tinamou commonly found in swamp forest in tropical regions of South America.

Taxonomy
The rusty tinamou is a monotypic species. All tinamou are from the family Tinamidae, and in the larger scheme are also ratites. Unlike other ratites, tinamous can fly, although in general, they are not strong fliers. All ratites evolved from prehistoric flying birds, and tinamous are the closest living relative of these birds.

Etymology
Crypturellus is formed from three Latin or Greek words.  kruptos meaning covered or hidden, oura meaning tail, and ellus meaning diminutive.  Therefore, Crypturellus means small hidden tail.

Range and habitat
It is found in tropical swamp forests and lowland forests, up to  altitude. This species is native to northeastern and northwestern Brazil, French Guiana, and eastern Peru in South America.

Description
Its upper parts are rufous boldly barred with black, its throat is white, its breast is bright rufous, its belly is white, and its flanks are barred black. Its crown is chestnut in color with legs that are yellowish-grey.

Behavior
Like other tinamous, the rusty tinamou eats fruit off the ground or low-lying bushes.  They also eat small amounts of invertebrates, flower buds, tender leaves, seeds, and roots. The male incubates the eggs which may come from as many as 4 different females, and then will raise them until they are ready to be on their own, usually 2–3 weeks. The nest is located on the ground in dense brush or between raised root buttresses.

Footnotes

References
 
 
 
 
 

Crypturellus
Tinamous of South America
Birds of Brazil
Birds of the Guianas
Birds of Peru
Birds described in 1863
Taxa named by August von Pelzeln